FabricLive.80 is a 2015 DJ mix album by the electronic artist Mumdance. The album was released in 2015 as part of the FabricLive Mix Series.

Track listing

References

External links

FabricLive.80 at Fabric

Fabric (club) albums
2015 compilation albums